Ancylomenes adularans is a species of shrimp. It was first named by A. J. Bruce in 2003 in a journal article entitled "Periclimenes species (Crustacea: Decapoda: Pontoniinae) from far North Queens-land".

References

Palaemonoidea
Crustaceans described in 2003